Pukateine is an alkaloid found in the bark of the New Zealand tree Laurelia novae-zelandiae ("Pukatea"), as well as some South American plants. An extract from pukatea is used in traditional Māori herbal medicine as an analgesic.

Bernard Cracroft Aston studied the physical and chemical characteristics of the compound, and presented a paper with his findings to the Royal Society of New Zealand  on 11 May 1909.

See also

References 

Aporphine alkaloids
Analgesics
Phenols
Dopamine agonists
Benzodioxoles